Clarence Arlen Beam (born January 14, 1930) is an inactive Senior United States circuit judge of the United States Court of Appeals for the Eighth Circuit and a former United States District Judge of the United States District Court for the District of Nebraska.

Education and career

Born in Stapleton, Nebraska, Beam received a Bachelor of Science degree from the University of Nebraska–Lincoln in 1951, and was a captain in the United States Army during the Korean War from 1951 to 1953. He received a Juris Doctor from the University of Nebraska–Lincoln College of Law in 1965, and was thereafter in private practice in Lincoln, Nebraska until 1982.

Federal judicial service

On October 14, 1981, Beam was nominated by President Ronald Reagan to a seat on the United States District Court for the District of Nebraska vacated by Judge Robert Vernon Denney. Beam was confirmed by the United States Senate on November 18, 1981, and received his commission the same day. He served as Chief Judge from 1986 to 1987. His service terminated on November 9, 1987, due to elevation to the Eighth Circuit.

On July 1, 1987, Reagan nominated Beam to a seat on the United States Court of Appeals for the Eighth Circuit vacated by Judge Donald Roe Ross. Beam was confirmed by the Senate on November 6, 1987, and received his commission on November 9, 1987. He assumed senior status on February 1, 2001.

References

Sources
 

1930 births
20th-century American judges
Judges of the United States Court of Appeals for the Eighth Circuit
Judges of the United States District Court for the District of Nebraska
Living people
People from Logan County, Nebraska
United States Army officers
United States court of appeals judges appointed by Ronald Reagan
United States district court judges appointed by Ronald Reagan
University of Nebraska College of Law alumni